Mediodactylus ilamensis is a species of lizard in the family Gekkonidae. It is endemic to Iran.

References

Mediodactylus
Reptiles described in 2011
Geckos of Iran
Endemic fauna of Iran